Per Kjærgaard Nielsen  (31 January 1955) is a Danish sailor and Olympic medalist. He won a silver medal in the Tornado class at the 1980 Summer Olympics in Moscow along with Peter Due.

References

1955 births
Living people
Sailors at the 1976 Summer Olympics – Tornado
Sailors at the 1980 Summer Olympics – Tornado
Olympic sailors of Denmark
Danish male sailors (sport)
Olympic silver medalists for Denmark
Olympic medalists in sailing
Medalists at the 1980 Summer Olympics